Sør-Vågsøy is a former municipality in the old Sogn og Fjordane county in Norway.  The municipality existed from 1910 until 1964 and it encompassed the southern part of the island of Vågsøy and a small area on the mainland just east of the island. The area is now located in the present-day Kinn Municipality in Vestland county. The administrative centre of the municipality was Måløy, where Sør-Vågsøy Church is located. Other population centres in the municipality are the villages of Holvik, Vågsvåg, Torskangerpoll, Færestrand, and Ytre Oppedal.

Name
The municipality was named Sør-Vågsøy because it encompassed the southern part of Vågsøy island (sør means "southern" in Norwegian).  The Old Norse form of the island name was Vágsøy. The first element is the genitive case of vágr which means "bay" and the last element is øy which means "island".

History
Sør-Vågsøy was originally a part of the municipality of Selje (see formannskapsdistrikt law).  On 1 January 1910, the western part of the municipality of Selje was split off into the two new municipalities of Sør-Vågsøy and Nord-Vågsøy. Sør-Vågsøy had an initial population of 1,517.  On 1 July 1921, the Blesrød farm in Nord-Vågsøy (just north of Måløy) was transferred to Sør-Vågsøy. During the 1960s, there were many municipal mergers across Norway due to the work of the Schei Committee. On 1 January 1964, the new Vågsøy Municipality was created by merging the municipalities of Sør-Vågsøy (population: 3,926) and Nord-Vågsøy (population: 1,476) with parts of the neighboring municipalities of Davik and Selje.

Government

Municipal council
The municipal council  of Sør-Vågsøy was made up of 29 representatives that were elected to four year terms.  The party breakdown of the final municipal council was as follows:

See also
List of former municipalities of Norway

External links

References

Kinn
Former municipalities of Norway
1910 establishments in Norway
1964 disestablishments in Norway